The Jubilee Arena also known as Jubilee Rink and l'Aréna Jubilee was an indoor arena located in Montreal, Quebec, Canada. It was located at the area bounded by rue Alphonse-D. Roy Street (then known as rue Malborough) and rue Ste. Catherine Est. It was used for games of the Montreal Canadiens hockey club of the National Hockey Association (NHA) and National Hockey League (NHL) from 1909 to 1910 and again in 1919, and it was home of the Montreal Wanderers NHA club from 1910. It was originally built in 1908 and held seating for 3,200 spectators.

Ownership of the Jubilee Rink played a significant role in the 1909 formation of the NHA. In November 1909, the owner of the Eastern Canada Hockey Association (ECHA) Wanderers club announced he would move the team to the Jubilee, which he also owned. As it was smaller than the Montreal Arena, and the other three members of the ECHA would earn less revenues when playing there, these owners dissolved the ECHA, formed the Canadian Hockey Association (CHA) and invited applications from other teams.  At a meeting on November 25, the CHA rejected the application of the Wanderers, represented at the meeting by player Jimmy Gardner, as well as the application of Ambrose O'Brien's Renfrew Creamery Kings.  Before leaving the building, Gardner and O'Brien decided to form the NHA, which was finalized on December 2. Poor ticket sales collapsed the CHA eight weeks after it was formed, and the popular ECHA/CHA Ottawa Hockey Club (reigning Stanley Cup champion) and Montreal Shamrocks immediately joined the seven-week-old NHA.

In 1918, when the Montreal Arena burned down, the Canadiens moved into Jubilee Arena on a full-time basis.  On the afternoon of April 23, 1919, Jubilee Arena also burned down, forcing the Habs to build and move into the Mount Royal Arena which opened in 1920. The site of the old arena is now occupied by industrial tenants bearing no reminder of the former hockey venue.

See also
 National Hockey Association
 National Hockey League
 Victoria Skating Rink

References

 
 

Defunct indoor arenas in Canada
History of Montreal
Defunct indoor ice hockey venues in Canada
Sports venues in Montreal
Defunct National Hockey League venues
Burned buildings and structures in Canada
Mercier–Hochelaga-Maisonneuve
Montreal Canadiens
Montreal Wanderers